Tetrameraden is a monospecific genus of ovoviviparous velvet worm, containing the single species Tetrameraden meringos. This species has 15 pairs of legs in both sexes. The type locality of this species is the Warrumbungle Range, New South Wales, Australia.

References

Further reading 
 

Onychophorans of Australasia
Onychophoran genera
Monotypic protostome genera
Fauna of New South Wales
Endemic fauna of Australia
Taxa named by Amanda Reid (malacologist)